Ghana's Most Beautiful is a beauty pageant TV program that educate Ghanaians and the global community about the various cultural values and heritage in the sixteen(16) regions of Ghana. The program is organized by TV3 and its media partners. The aim of the pageant program is to promote development through culture and unity.

Awards 
The list of awards given to winners of the beauty pageant.

Region rankings

References 

Ghanaian television series